Elections to elect all members of the North West Leicestershire District Council took place on 2 May 2019, held as one of the English local elections of that year.

Summary

Election result

|-

Ward results

Appleby

Ashby Castle

Ashby Holywell

Ashby Ivanhoe

Ashby Money Hill

Ashby Willesley

Ashby Woulds

Bardon

Blackfordby

Broom Leys

Castle Donington Castle

Castle Donington Central

Castle Donington Park

Castle Rock

Coalville East

Coalville West

Daleacre

Ellistown and Battleflat

Greenhill

Hermitage

Holly Hayes

Hugglescote St. John's

Hugglescote St. Mary's

Ibstock East

Ibstock West

Kegworth

Long Whatton and Diseworth

Measham North

Measham South

Oakthorpe and Donisthorpe

Ravenstone and Packington

Sence Valley

Snibston North

Snibston South

Thornborough

Thringstone

Valley

Worthington and Breedon

References

2019
2019 English local elections
May 2019 events in the United Kingdom
2010s in Leicestershire